Plumbago auriculata, the cape leadwort, blue plumbago or Cape plumbago, is a species of flowering plant in the family Plumbaginaceae, native to South Africa.

The specific epithet auriculata means "with ears", referring to the shape of the leaves.

Description
The stems are long, thin, and climbing. The leaves alternate and are 2–5 cm.

The five petals are about 2 cm wide and can be pale blue, blue or violet in color. There also variations with white (P. auriculata var. alba) or deep blue (P. auriculata 'Royal Cape') flowers. The flowers are arranged in a corymb-like and raceme inflorescence. The flower of this plant is complete and bisexual. The sepals and petals are connate while the pistil is adnate. The ovary of the flower is superior and the flower has regular symmetry. It has basal placentation, with 1 locule and 5 carpels. It flowers mostly in the summer, but in the right conditions it can bloom year-round.

Distribution
Native to South Africa, it extends from the Southern Cape region to Eastern Cape and KwaZulu-Natal. It can also be found in Gauteng and the adjoining areas of Free State and the North West Province. There is also an isolated occurrence in Mpumalanga. Typically the species grows in bushes or thickets. As an ornamental plant, it is widespread today in the tropics and subtropics (including the Mediterranean region).

Biology
It is visited by various butterflies. Their leaves serve as food for the caterpillar of Hummingbird hawk-moth. Conversely, the sticky sepals sometimes catch animals up to the size of a housefly. It is believed that the plumbago species living today are very similar to the first ancestors of Drosera and other carnivorous plants.

Phytochemistry
Many secondary metabolites have been discovered and isolated from Plumbago auriculata such as plumbagin and  palmitic acids.

Cultivation
In temperate regions it may be grown outside in frost free areas, otherwise under glass. It grows best in full sun to part shade.

The species and the white-flowered form P. auriculata f. alba have both gained the Royal Horticultural Society's Award of Garden Merit.

Plumbago auriculata can be propagated sexually by seeds and asexually by cutting in summer. It needs well-aerated soil and light and prefers acidic soil.

Gallery

References

auriculata
Carnivorous plants of Africa
Flora of South Africa